C. Douglas Weaver is an American author, historian, and Professor of Religion. A Baptist, Weaver has taught at Baylor University and Mercer University. He has authored multiple books on the history of Pentecostalism and the Baptist church.

Works

External links
Doug Weaver's Baylor Biography

Living people
American Christian writers
Baylor University faculty
Mercer University faculty
Year of birth missing (living people)